Dexiinae is a subfamily of flies in the family Tachinidae.

Tribes & genera
Tribe Dexiini
Aglummyia Townsend, 1912
Amphitropesa Townsend, 1933
Ateloglossa Coquillett, 1899
Bathydexia Wulp, 1891
Billaea Robineau-Desvoidy, 1830
Callotroxis Aldrich, 1929
Camarona Wulp, 1891
Cantrellius Barraclough, 1992
Carbonilla Mesnil, 1974
Chaetocalirrhoe Townsend, 1935
Chaetodexia Mesnil, 1976
Chaetogyne Brauer & von Bergenstamm, 1889
Chaetotheresia Townsend, 1931
Charapozelia Townsend, 1927
Cordillerodexia Townsend, 1927
Daetaleus Aldrich, 1928>
Dasyuromyia Bigot, 1885
Dexia Meigen, 1826
Diaugia Perty, 1833
Dinera Robineau-Desvoidy, 1830
Dolichocodia Townsend, 1908
Dolichodinera Townsend, 1935
Echinodexia Brauer & von Bergenstamm, 1893
Effusimentum Barraclough, 1992
Estheria Robineau-Desvoidy, 1830
Euchaetogyne Townsend, 1908
Eudexia Brauer & von Bergenstamm, 1889
Eumegaparia Townsend, 1908
Eupododexia Villeneuve, 1915
Exodexia Townsend, 1927
Frontodexia Mesnil, 1976
Gemursa Barraclough, 1992
Geraldia Malloch, 1930
Gigamyiopsis Reinhard, 1964
Heterometopia Macquart, 1846
Huascarodexia Townsend, 1919
Hyadesimyia Bigot, 1888
Hyosoma Aldrich, 1934
Hystrichodexia Röder, 1886
Hystrisyphona Bigot, 1859
Jurinodexia Townsend, 1915
Leptodexia Townsend, 1919
Macrometopa Brauer & von Bergenstamm, 1889
Mastigiomyia Reinhard, 1964
Megaparia Wulp, 1891
Megapariopsis Townsend, 1915
Mesnilotrix Cerretti & O’Hara, 2016
Microchaetina Wulp, 1891
Microchaetogyne Townsend, 1931
Milada Richter, 1973
Mitannia Herting, 1987
Mochlosoma Brauer & von Bergenstamm, 1889
Morphodexia Townsend, 1931
Myiodexia Cortés & Campos, 1971
Myiomima Brauer & von Bergenstamm, 1889
Myioscotiptera Giglio-Tos, 1893
Neomyostoma Townsend, 1935
Neozelia Guimarães, 1975
Nicephorus Reinhard, 1944
Nimioglossa Reinhard, 1945
Notodytes Aldrich, 1934
Oberonomyia Reinhard, 1964
Ochrocera Townsend, 1916
Ocyrtosoma Townsend, 1912
Ophirodexia Townsend, 1911
Opsotheresia Townsend, 1919
Orestilla Reinhard, 1944
Orthosimyia Reinhard, 1944
Pachymyia Macquart, 1844
Patulifrons Barraclough, 1992
Paulipalpus Barraclough, 1992
Pelycops Aldrich, 1934
Phalacrophyto Townsend, 1915
Phasiops Coquillett, 1899
Philippodexia Townsend, 1926
Piligena Van Emden, 1947
Piligenoides Barraclough, 1985
Pirionimyia Townsend, 1931
Platydexia Van Emden, 1954
Platyrrhinodexia Townsend, 1927
Platytainia Macquart, 1851
Pododexia Brauer & von Bergenstamm, 1889
Pretoriamyia Curran, 1927
Promegaparia Townsend, 1931
Prophorostoma Townsend, 1927
Prorhynchops Brauer & von Bergenstamm, 1891
Prosena Lepeletier & Serville, 1828
Prosenina Malloch, 1930
Prosenoides Brauer & von Bergenstamm, 1891
Psecacera Bigot, 1880
Pseudodexilla O’Hara, Shima & Zhang, 2009
Pseudodinera Brauer & von Bergenstamm, 1891
Ptilodexia Brauer & von Bergenstamm, 1889
Punamyocera Townsend, 1919
Rasiliverpa Barraclough, 1992
Rhamphinina Bigot, 1885
Rutilotrixa Townsend, 1933
Sarcocalirrhoe Townsend, 1928
Sarcoprosena Townsend, 1927
Schistostephana Townsend, 1919
Scotiptera Macquart, 1835
Senostoma Macquart, 1847
Setolestes Aldrich, 1934
Sitellitergus Reinhard, 1964
Sturmiodexia Townsend, 1919
Sumichrastia Townsend, 1916
Taperamyia Townsend, 1935
Tesseracephalus Reinhard, 1955
Trichodura Macquart, 1844
Trichostylum Macquart, 1851
Trixa Meigen, 1824
Trixiceps Villeneuve, 1936
Trixodes Coquillett, 1902
Tromodesiopsis Townsend, 1927
Tropidodexia Townsend, 1915
Tropidopsiomorpha Townsend, 1927
Tylodexia Townsend, 1926
Tyreomma Brauer & von Bergenstamm, 1891
Urodexiomima Townsend, 1927
Ursophyto Aldrich, 1926
Ushpayacua Townsend, 1928
Villanovia Strobl, 1910
Xanthotheresia Townsend, 1931
Yahuarmayoia Townsend, 1927
Zelia Robineau-Desvoidy, 1830
Zeliomima Mesnil, 1976
Zeuxia Meigen, 1826
Zeuxiotrix Mesnil, 1976
Tribe Doleschallini
Doleschalla Walker, 1861
Torocca Walker, 1859
Tribe Dufouriini
Chetoptilia Rondani, 1862
Comyops Wulp, 1891
Dufouria Robineau-Desvoidy, 1830
Ebenia Macquart, 1846
Eugymnopeza Townsend, 1933
Euoestrophasia Townsend, 1892
Jamacaria Curran, 1928
Kambaitimyia Mesnil, 1953
Mesnilana Van Emden, 1945
Microsoma Macquart, 1855
Oestrophasia Brauer & von Bergenstamm, 1889
Pandelleia Villeneuve, 1907
Rhinophoroides Barraclough, 2005
Rondania Robineau-Desvoidy, 1850
Tribe Epigrimyiini
Beskia Brauer & von Bergenstamm, 1889
Epigrimyia Townsend, 1891
Tribe Eutherini
Euthera Loew, 1866
Redtenbacheria Schiner, 1861
Tribe Freraeini
Freraea Robineau-Desvoidy, 1830
Tribe Imitomyiini
Imitomyia Townsend, 1912
Proriedelia Mesnil, 1953
Riedelia Mesnil, 1942
Tribe Rutiliini
Amphibolia Macquart, 1844
Chetogaster Macquart, 1851
Chrysopasta Brauer & von Bergenstamm, 1889
Formodexia Crosskey, 1973
Formosia Guerin-Meneville, 1843
Prodiaphania Townsend, 1927
Rutilia Robineau-Desvoidy, 1830
Rutilodexia Townsend, 1915
Tribe Sophiini
Cordyligaster Macquart, 1844
Cryptosophia De Santis, 2018
Euantha Wulp, 1885
Euanthoides Townsend, 1931
Leptidosophia Townsend, 1931
Neoeuantha Townsend, 1931
Neosophia Guimarães, 1982
Sophia Robineau-Desvoidy, 1830
Sophiella Guimarães, 1982
Tribe Telothyriini
Comatacta Coquillett, 1902
Euptilomyia Townsend, 1939
Eutelothyria Townsend, 1931
Floradalia Thompson, 1963
Ptilomyiopsis Townsend, 1933
Ptilomyoides Curran, 1928
Telothyria Wulp, 1890
Tribe Uramyini
Itaplectops Townsend, 1927
Matucania Townsend, 1919
Thelairaporia Guimarães, 1980
Trinitodexia Townsend, 1935
Uramya Robineau-Desvoidy, 1830
Tribe Voriini
Actinochaetopteryx Townsend, 1927
Actinoplagia Blanchard, 1940
Aldrichiopa Guimarães, 1971
Aldrichomyia Özdikmen, 2006
Alexogloblinia Cortés, 1945
Allothelaira Villeneuve, 1915
Alpinoplagia Townsend, 1931
Argyromima Brauer & von Bergenstamm, 1889
Arrhinactia Townsend, 1927
Ateloglutus Aldrich, 1934
Bahrettinia Özdikmen, 2007
Blepharomyia Brauer & von Bergenstamm, 1889
Calcager Hutton, 1901
Calcageria Curran, 1927
Campylocheta Rondani, 1859
Cesamorelosia Koçak & Kemal, 2010
Chaetodemoticus Brauer & von Bergenstamm, 1891
Chaetonopsis Townsend, 1915
Chaetoplagia Coquillett, 1895
Chaetovoria Villeneuve, 1920
Chiloclista Townsend, 1931
Cockerelliana Townsend, 1915
Comyopsis Townsend, 1919
Coracomyia Aldrich, 1934
Cowania Reinhard, 1952
Cyrtophleba Rondani, 1856
Dexiomimops Townsend, 1926
Dischotrichia Cortés, 1944
Doliolomyia Reinhard, 1975
Elfriedella Mesnil, 1957
Engeddia Kugler, 1977
Eriothrix Meigen, 1803
Eulasiona Townsend, 1892
Euptilopareia Townsend, 1916
Feriola Mesnil, 1957
Ganopleuron Aldrich, 1934
Goniochaeta Townsend, 1891
Halydaia Egger, 1856
Haracca Richter, 1995
Heliaea Curran, 1934
Homohypochaeta Townsend, 1927
Hyleorus Aldrich, 1926
Hypochaetopsis Townsend, 1915
Hypovoria Villeneuve, 1913
Hystricovoria Townsend, 1928
Itamintho Townsend, 1931
Kirbya Robineau-Desvoidy, 1830
Klugia Robineau-Desvoidy, 1863
Leptomacquartia Townsend, 1919
Leptothelaira Mesnil & Shima, 1979
Meledonus Aldrich, 1926
Meleterus Aldrich, 1926
Metaplagia Coquillett, 1895
Metopomuscopteryx Townsend, 1915
Micronychiops Townsend, 1915
Microplagia Townsend, 1915
Minthoplagia Townsend, 1915
Muscopteryx Townsend, 1892
Myiochaeta Cortés, 1967
Myioclura Reinhard, 1975
Myiophasiopsis Townsend, 1927
Nanoplagia Villeneuve, 1929
Nardia Cerretti, 2009
Neochaetoplagia Blanchard, 1963
Neocyrtophoeba Vimmer & Soukup, 1940
Neopaedarium Blanchard, 1943
Neosolieria Townsend, 1927
Neotrafoiopsis Townsend, 1931
Nephochaetona Townsend, 1919
Nephoplagia Townsend, 1919
Nothovoria Cortés & González, 1989
Pachynocera Townsend, 1919
Paedarium Aldrich, 1926
Parahypochaeta Brauer & von Bergenstamm, 1891
Parodomyiops Townsend, 1935
Periscepsia Gistel, 1848
Peteina Meigen, 1838
Phaeodema Aldrich, 1934
Phasiophyto Townsend, 1919
Phyllomya Robineau-Desvoidy, 1830
Piriona Aldrich, 1928
Plagiomima Brauer & von Bergenstamm, 1891
Plagiomyia Curran, 1927
Polygaster Wulp, 1890
Polygastropteryx Mesnil, 1953
Prosenactia Blanchard, 1940
Prosheliomyia Brauer & von Bergenstamm, 1891
Prosopochaeta Macquart, 1851
Pseudodexia Brauer & von Bergenstamm, 1891
Reichardia Karsch, 1886
Rhamphina Macquart, 1835
Rhombothyria Wulp, 1891
Solomonilla Özdikmen, 2007
Spathidexia Townsend, 1912
Spiroglossa Doleschall, 1858
Squamomedina Townsend, 1934
Stenodexia Wulp, 1891
Stomina Robineau-Desvoidy, 1830
Subfischeria Villeneuve, 1937
Thelaira Robineau-Desvoidy, 1830
Thelairodes Wulp, 1891
Thryptodexia Malloch, 1926
Trafoia Brauer & von Bergenstamm, 1893
Trichodischia Bigot, 1885
Trichopyrrhosia Townsend, 1927
Trismegistomya Reinhard, 1967
Trochilochaeta Townsend, 1940
Trochilodes Coquillett, 1903
Uclesia Girschner, 1901
Uclesiella Malloch, 1938
Velardemyia Valencia, 1972
Voria Robineau-Desvoidy, 1830
Wagneria Robineau-Desvoidy, 1830
Xanthodexia Wulp, 1891
Xanthopteromyia Townsend, 1926
Zonalia Curran, 1934
Unplaced genera of Dexiinae
Carmodymyia Thompson, 1963
Euthyprosopiella Blanchard, 1963
Litophasia Girschner, 1887
Medinophyto Townsend, 1927
Melanesomyia Barraclough, 1998
Schlingermyia Cortés, 1967

References 

 
Brachycera subfamilies
Taxa named by Pierre-Justin-Marie Macquart